Michael Wayne Burns (born April 6, 1954) is a former American football defensive back who played two seasons in the National Football League with the San Francisco 49ers and Detroit Lions. He was drafted by the San Francisco 49ers in the sixth round of the 1977 NFL Draft. He first enrolled at Contra Costa College before transferring to University of Southern California. Burns attended El Cerrito High School in El Cerrito, California.

References

External links
Just Sports Stats

Living people
1954 births
Players of American football from Oakland, California
American football defensive backs
USC Trojans football players
San Francisco 49ers players
Detroit Lions players